The Superior Shipbuilding Company was originally called the American Steel Barge Company, and based in Duluth, Minnesota. It was founded by Scottish Captain Alexander McDougall who founded it so he could produce his new whaleback ship, this was Whaleback Barge 101. In 1900 McDougall sold his firm to the American Ship Building Company which transferred the company to Superior, Wisconsin and renamed it Superior Shipbuilding Company, also called AmShip Superior. After World War I the yard stopped manufacturing ships and instead turned to repair work. They continued repairing ships until 1945 when American Ship Building Company decided to sell it. It was initially known as the Knudsen Brothers Shipbuilding & Dry Dock Company. In 1955 it was renamed Fraser-Nelson Shipyards then Fraser Shipyards and still exists today. Fraser Shipyards does dry dock work, also conversions: steam to diesel and coal-fired to oil-burning. Lake Assault boat builders operate out of Fraser Shipyards.

Ships built

American Steel Barge Company of Duluth, Minnesota

American Steel Barge Company of Superior, Wisconsin

Superior Shipbuilding Company of Superior, Wisconsin

See also
Great Lakes Engineering Works
Collingwood Shipbuilding Company
Defoe Shipbuilding Company
Manitowoc Shipbuilding Company
American Ship Building Company

References

Superior, Wisconsin
Great Lakes
Lake Superior